The Black Duke is a 1963 Italian historical adventure film directed by Pino Mercanti.

Plot 
The domain of the cruel Cesare Borgia is opposed by Caterina Sforza, who gives the assignment to the beautiful Geneva to assassinate him. But Geneva and Cesare fall in love.

Cast 

 Cameron Mitchell as Cesare Borgia
 Maria Grazia Spina as  Ginevra 
 Conrado San Martín as Riccardo Brancaleone 
 Franco Fantasia as Veniero 
 Gloria Osuna  as  Lucrezia Borgia  
 Manuel Castineiras as  Tancredi 
 Dina De Santis as  Lavinia Serpieri 
 Gloria Milland as  Caterina Sforza
 Giovanni Vari as  Morialdo
 Giulio Maculani as  Giulio 
 Nino Persello as Tito Serpieri 
 Silvio Bagolini as  Serafino 
 Piero Gerlini as  Gabino

References

External links

1963 films
1963 adventure films
Italian adventure films
Italian swashbuckler films
Films directed by Pino Mercanti
Films set in the 1490s
Films set in the 16th century
Cultural depictions of Cesare Borgia
Cultural depictions of Lucrezia Borgia
Cultural depictions of Caterina Sforza
1960s Italian films